Georgiadis is a Greek patronymic surname meaning "the son of George".

There are variations of the surname: The male version (Γεωργιάδης) can be spelled as 'Georgiadis' or 'Georgiades' and there are two female versions (Γεωργιάδη or Γεωργιάδου) spelled as 'Georgiadi' or 'Georgiadou'.

Notable people with this surname include:

Men 
 Adonis Georgiadis, Greek politician (deputy minister), publisher and author
 Constantinos Georgiades (born 1985), Greek Cypriot footballer
 Costa Georgiadis (born 1964), Greek Australian TV personality
 Gabriel Georgiades (born 1957), Greek American professor
 Georgios Georgiadis (disambiguation), several people
 Harris Georgiades (born 1972), Greek Cypriot economist and politician
 Ioannis Georgiadis (1876-1960), Greek fencer
 John Georgiades (born 1966), Greek Australian rules footballer
 John Georgiadis (1939-2021), British orchestral conductor
 Nicholas Georgiade (1923-2001), Greek American film actor
 Nicholas Georgiadis, Greek painter, stage and costume designer
 Nico Georgiadis (born 1996), Swiss chess grandmaster
 Soulis Georgiades (1934-1997), Greek film producer
 Thrasybulos Georgiades (1907–1977), Greek musicologist working in Germany
 Vasilis Georgiadis (1921-2000), Greek film director

Women 
 Katerina Georgiadou (born 1982), Greek fashion model
 Margo Georgiadis, Greek American business executive, CEO of Mattel

Greek-language surnames
Surnames
Patronymic surnames
Surnames from given names